The Intrepid-class ships of the line were a class of fifteen 64-gun third rates, designed for the Royal Navy by Sir John Williams.  His design, approved on 18 December 1765, was slightly smaller than Sir Thomas Slade's contemporary  design of the same year, against which it was evaluated competitively. Following the prototype, four more ships were ordered in 1767–69, and a further ten between 1771 and 1779.

Ships

Builder: Woolwich Dockyard
Ordered: 16 November 1765
Laid down: January 1767
Launched: 4 December 1770
Completed: 31 January 1771
Fate: Sold to be broken up at Plymouth, 26 March 1828

Builder: Plymouth Dockyard
Ordered: 10 September 1767
Laid down: May 1768
Launched: 18 April 1772
Completed: 9 May 1778
Fate: Broken up at Portsmouth, January 1818

Builder: Woolwich Dockyard
Ordered: 9 June 1768
Laid down: October 1768
Launched: 31 August 1772
Completed: July 1778 at Portsmouth Dockyard
Fate: Wrecked in the Savannah River, 15 February 1780

Builder: Plymouth Dockyard
Ordered: 30 November 1769
Laid down: January 1770
Launched: 17 December 1774
Completed: 25 April 1776
Fate: Broken up at Sheerness, June 1802

Builder: Woolwich Dockyard
Ordered: 30 November 1769
Laid down: 9 September 1772
Launched: 26 November 1776
Completed: 27 February 1778
Fate: Broken up at Bermuda, April 1821

Builder: Henry & Anthony Adams, Bucklers Hard
Ordered: 14 January 1771
Laid down: February 1771
Launched: 6 October 1774
Completed: 11 July 1778 at Portsmouth Dockyard
Fate: Broken up at Portsmouth , April 1816

Builder: John & William Wells, Rotherhithe
Ordered: 14 January 1771
Laid down: April 1771
Launched: 12 May 1774
Completed: 30 July 1776 at Woolwich Dockyard
Fate: Broken up at Chatham, October 1812

Builder: Deptford Dockyard
Ordered: 18 June 1771
Laid down: October 1771
Launched: 5 August 1777
Completed: 29 March 1778
Fate: Broken up, 1807

Builder: Plymouth Dockyard
Ordered: 24 April 1773
Laid down: January 1774
Launched: 4 September 1781
Completed: 15 October 1781
Fate: Wrecked in Mounts Bay, 29 December 1807

Builder: Sheerness Dockyard
Ordered: 1 December 1773
Laid down: January 1776
Launched: 27 April 1782
Completed: 24 July 1782
Fate: Broken up at Chatham, September 1827

Builder: Deptford Dockyard
Ordered: 16 October 1775
Laid down: 23 August 1777
Launched: 14 October 1780
Completed: 29 December 1780 at Woolwich Dockyard.
Fate: Broken up at Sheerness, July 1813

Builder: Woolwich Dockyard
Ordered: 25 July 1776
Laid down: 20 October 1777
Launched: 8 May 1781
Completed: 29 June 1781
Fate: Sold to be broken up, 30 May 1832

Builder: Robert Fabian, East Cowes
Ordered: 5 February 1777
Laid down: 12 January 1778
Launched: 28 November 1780
Completed: 15 February 1781 at Portsmouth Dockyard.
Fate: Wrecked off Ushant, 10 March 1800

Builder: Chatham Dockyard
Ordered: 5 December 1777
Laid down: 2 November 1778
Launched: 19 December 1782
Completed: 19 July 1783
Fate: Broken up at Plymouth, September 1832

Builder: Deptford Dockyard
Ordered: 5 August 1779
Laid down: May 1780
Launched: 8 October 1782
Completed: 19 December 1782 at Woolwich Dockyard
Fate: Broken up at Sheerness, October 1816

References

Lavery, Brian (2003) The Ship of the Line - Volume 1: The development of the battlefleet 1650-1850. Conway Maritime Press. .
Lyon, David (1993) The Sailing Navy List Conway Maritime Press. .
Winfield, Rif (2007) British Warships in the Age of Sail 1714-1792: Design, Construction, Careers and Fates. Seaforth Publishing. .

 
Ship of the line classes